Juan Avellaneda Manrique was a Roman Catholic prelate who served as Auxiliary Bishop of Toledo (1611–1619?) and Titular Bishop of Sidon.

Biography
On 30 May 1611, Juan Avellaneda Manrique was appointed during the papacy of Pope Paul V as Auxiliary Bishop of Toledo and Titular Bishop of Sidon. While bishop, he was the principal co-consecrator of Francisco González Zárate, Bishop of Cartagena (1616); and Baltasar Moscoso y Sandoval, Bishop of Jaén (1619).

See also
Catholic Church in Spain

References

External links and additional sources
 (for Chronology of Bishops) 
 (for Chronology of Bishops) 

16th-century Roman Catholic bishops in Spain
Bishops appointed by Pope Paul V
16th-century Roman Catholic titular bishops